The 1993 South American Championships in Athletics were held in Lima, Peru on 2, 3 and 4 July.

Medal summary

Men's events

Women's events

Medal table

See also
1993 in athletics (track and field)

External links
 Men Results – GBR Athletics
 Women Results – GBR Athletics

S
South American Championships in Athletics
Sports competitions in Lima
International athletics competitions hosted by Peru
1993 in South American sport
1993 in Peruvian sport